Mbo or MBO may refer to:

 Mbo, Nigeria, a Local Government Area
 Mbo people (Cameroon), an ethnic group of Cameroon
 Mbo people (Congo), an ethnic group of the Democratic Republic of the Congo

Language
 Mbo language (Cameroon), a language spoken in Cameroon
 Mbo language (Congo), spoken by the Mbo people
 Mbo language (Zambia), a Bantu language of Zambia
 Mbo’ language, a Grassfields language of Cameroon

People
 Mbo Mpenza (born 1976), retired Belgian footballer 
 Emil Abossolo-Mbo (Emil Abossolo M'Bo born 1958), Cameroonian-French actor

Other uses
 Management by objectives, a performance management system popularised by Peter Drucker
 Management buyout, a form of company acquisition
 Muslim Bosniak Organization, a Bosnian political party
 Middelbaar beroepsonderwijs (middle-level applied education), a level of education in the Netherlands

See also
 Nkongho language, or Upper Mbo, a Bantu language of Cameroon
 MBO Cinemas, a chain of cinemas in Malaysia
 Mbo-Ung language, a language spoken in Papua New Guinea
 Klein + M.B.O., an Italian musical group 
 MBO (record label), a Thai record label
 Mbo language (disambiguation)